The Animator's Survival Kit: A Manual of Methods, Principles, and Formulas for Classical, Computer, Games, Stop Motion, and Internet Animators is an instructional book by Academy Award-winning animator and director Richard Williams. The book includes techniques, advice, tips, tricks, and general information on the history of animation.

DVDs
Animation examples from the book combined with footage from Richard Williams' masterclasses have been put into a 16-volume DVD box set titled The Animator's Survival Kit – Animated. The logo from the book cover was completely animated in the traditional style, taking Williams and his animators 9 months to complete. Williams also included some early drafts of his own work from previous projects.

Reception 
The book met with universal acclaim. Chris Wedge, the director of Epic and the Oscar-nominated Ice Age, wrote about the book: "What I came out with was a complete re-structuring of animation, how I saw animation, how I analysed motion. People the first night sat down at their work stations and were running some of Richard's examples ... and at lunchtime you could see the influence. It was a revelation." It was also turned into an iPad app in 2013.

See also 
Character animation
Traditional animation
Stop-motion animation
Flash animation
Computer animation

References

External links 
 
 
 Official YouTube channel

Animator's Survival Kit, The
Animator's Survival Kit
Animator's Survival Kit
Animation techniques
Faber and Faber books
2001 non-fiction books
Works by Richard Williams (animator)